Enrique Wong Pujada (born 26 June 1941, in Lima), is a Peruvian politician of Chinese descent. He was elected as a Congressman of the Republic of Peru in the 2011 elections for the 2011–2016 term, representing Callao. He was elected under the Alliance for the Great Change ticket and later left and joined National Solidarity. He was previously a Deputy representing Callao from 1985 to 1990. He was previously a District Councilor representing San Martín de Porres from 1999 to 2002, elected under the Fujimorist Vamos Vecino of Alberto Fujimori. In the 2018 regional elections, he ran for Regional Governor of Callao under the newly Podemos Perú party, but he was not elected, attaining only 3.6% of the vote.

In 1998 he was elected district councilor of San Martín de Porres by the Vamos Vecino movement, a position he held between 1999 and 2002.

In the 2002 regional elections, he unsuccessfully ran for the position of Callao regional councilor for the Independent Movement Chim Pum Callao.

In the general elections of 2006 he ran for Congress for the National Justice party, without being elected. Nor was his candidacy for the provincial mayor of Callao successful in the 2010 regional elections, running for the Mi Callao movement, and losing the elections again, this time against Juan Sotomayor García.

In 1966 he graduated as a doctor at the Medical School of Mexico, and in 1972 he completed a postgraduate degree in internal medicine at the Mexican Institute of Social Security. He served as general manager of his family-founded clinic in San Martín de Porres, Lima, between 2003 and 2009.

Controversy
In 2011 Wong was accused by his sister of mismanaging his family clinic for personal gain and tax avoidance.

References

1941 births
Living people
Fujimorista politicians
Members of the Chamber of Deputies of Peru
Members of the Congress of the Republic of Peru
Instituto Politécnico Nacional alumni
Peruvian politicians of Chinese descent
Peruvian internists
20th-century Peruvian physicians
21st-century Peruvian physicians
Physicians from Lima
National Solidarity Party (Peru) politicians